Johal is an Indian surname and clan of the Jat caste found in the states of Punjab and Haryana.

Notable persons with that name include:

 Balinder Johal, Indo-Canadian actress
 Bindy Johal (1971–1998), Indian-Canadian gangster
 Hardial Singh Johal ( 1947–2002), Indian-Canadian Engineer
 Herbinder Singh Johl, Indo-Canadian Olympic wrestler 
 Jagbir Johal, renowned British-Indian professor 
 Jas Johal, Indo-Canadian Politician 
 Kuldesh Johal (born 1980), English snooker player
 Nachhatar Singh Johal (born 1979), Indian sailor
 Sardara Singh Johl (born 1928), Indian agriculture economist

References

Indian surnames
Hindu surnames
Punjabi tribes
Punjabi-language surnames